Saudade is an album by Brazilian composer Moacir Santos recorded in 1974 and released on the Blue Note label.

Reception
The Allmusic review awarded the album 3 stars.

Track listing
 "Early Morning Love" (Santos, Yanna Cotti) - 3:25
 "A Saudade Matta a Gente" (Antonio Almeida, J. de Barro) - 6:10
 "Off and On" (Santos, Cotti) - 3:37
 "The City of LA" (Mark Levine) - 3:38
 "Suk Cha" (Santos) - 4:06
 "Kathy" (Santos, Ray Evans, Jay Livingston) - 3:37
 "Haply-Happy" (Santos, Petsye Powell) - 2:59
 "Amphibious" (Santos, Assis) - 3:25
 "This Life" (Santos, Cotti) - 2:33
 "What's My Name" (Santos, Evans, Livingston) - 3:07
Recorded at United Artists Studios in West Hollywood, California on March 5, 6 & 12, 1974

Personnel
Moacir Santos - alto saxophone, baritone saxophone, conductor, arranger
Steve Huffsteter - trumpet, flugelhorn
Benny Powell - trombone
Morris Repass - bass trombone
Sidney Muldrow - french horn
Ray Pizzi - bassoon, alto saxophone, tenor saxophone, flute, piccolo
Jerome Richardson - soprano saxophone, alto saxophone, tenor saxophone, baritone saxophone, flute, alto flute
Mark Levine - piano, electric piano, arranger
Lee Ritenour - guitar, electric guitar
John Heard - bass, electric bass
Harvey Mason - drums
Mayuto Correa, Carmelo Garcia - conga, percussion
Donald Alves, Mike Campbell, Jose Marino, Petsye Powell, Carmen Saveiros, Regina Werneck - backing vocals

References

Blue Note Records albums
Moacir Santos albums
1974 albums
Albums produced by Duke Pearson